RV Atlantis II is a research vessel formerly operated by Woods Hole Oceanographic Institution.  The ship was built in 1962. She was used as the support vessel for the Alvin submersible for many years, and retired from Woods Hole service in 1996. After a period of inactivity in New Orleans, she was transferred to the travel adventure company Outlander Expeditions in 2006. In 1986 she was used by Dr. Robert Ballard as mother-ship to DSV Alvin when Ballard and team surveyed the  wreck for the first time. The Titanic expedition was sponsored by National Geographic.

The following seafloor features have been named for RV Atlantis II:
 Atlantis II Seamounts in the North Atlantic 
 Atlantis II Fracture Zone in the Indian Ocean

References

External links 
 Atlantis II returns to Woods Hole after 11 years
 Ships & Vehicles Used in 1986 Discovery of Titanic

1962 ships
Ships built in Baltimore
Woods Hole Oceanographic Institution
Research vessels of the United States
University-National Oceanographic Laboratory System research vessels